Saint-Ciers-d'Abzac is a commune in the Gironde department in Nouvelle-Aquitaine in southwestern France.

Population

Twin town
 Seròs, Spain, since 1993.

See also
Communes of the Gironde department

References

Communes of Gironde